Polyalthia is a genus of flowering plants in the family Annonaceae. There are approximately 90 species distributed from Africa to Asia and the Pacific.

These are trees and shrubs. The flower has six petals in two whorls, the inner petals curving inward over the centre.

The name Polyalthia is derived from a combination of Greek words meaning ‘many cures’ with reference to the medicinal properties of certain species.

Species
This large genus was known to be polyphyletic, with many species having been separated and reassigned to other genera.  Species have also been transferred into this genus (e.g. P. malabarica from Phaeanthus).

Plants of the World Online currently includes the following as accepted:

 Polyalthia angustissima  Ridl.
 Polyalthia barenensis Bân
 Polyalthia borneensis  Merr.
 Polyalthia bracteosa Bân
 Polyalthia bromantha  I.M.Turner
 Polyalthia brunneifolia J.Sinclair
 Polyalthia bullata  King
 Polyalthia castanea  Ridl.
 Polyalthia cauliflora  Hook.f. & Thomson
 Polyalthia celebica  Miq.
 Polyalthia charitopoda  I.M.Turner
 Polyalthia chinii  I.M.Turner & Utteridge
 Polyalthia chrysotricha  Ridl.
 Polyalthia cinnamomea  Hook.f. & Thomson
 Polyalthia clemensiorum Jovet-Ast
 Polyalthia consanguinea  Merr.
 Polyalthia corticosa  (Pierre) Finet & Gagnep.
 Polyalthia debilis  (Pierre) Finet & Gagnep.
 Polyalthia dictyoneura  Diels
 Polyalthia dolichopoda  I.M.Turner
 Polyalthia dumosa  King
 Polyalthia elegans  K.Schum. & Lauterb.
 Polyalthia elliptica  (Blume) Blume
 Polyalthia endertii  D.M.Johnson
 Polyalthia evecta  (Pierre) Finet & Gagnep.
 Polyalthia flagellaris  (Becc.) Airy Shaw
 Polyalthia fruticosa  (Jessup) B.Xue & R.M.K.Saunders
 Polyalthia gamopetala  Boerl. ex Koord.-Schum.
 Polyalthia gracilicolumnaris  H.Okada, Tsukaya & Suleiman
 Polyalthia gracilipes  Merr.
 Polyalthia guabatuensis  I.M.Turner & Utteridge
 Polyalthia guamusangensis  I.M.Turner & Utteridge
 Polyalthia heteropetala  (Diels) Ghesq.
 Polyalthia hirtifolia J.Sinclair
 Polyalthia hispida  B.Xue & R.M.K.Saunders
 Polyalthia ichthyosma  I.M.Turner
 Polyalthia igniflora  D.M.Johnson
 Polyalthia insignis  (Hook.f.) Airy Shaw (synonym Polyalthia elmeri Merr.)
 Polyalthia intermedia  (Pierre) Bân
 Polyalthia johnsonii  (F.Muell.) B.Xue & R.M.K.Saunders
 Polyalthia kanchanaburiana  Khumch. & Thongp.
 Polyalthia kinabaluensis  I.M.Turner
 Polyalthia lanceolata  S.Vidal
 Polyalthia lancilimba  C.Y.Wu ex P.T.Li
 Polyalthia lasioclada  I.M.Turner
 Polyalthia lateritia J.Sinclair
 Polyalthia longirostris  (Scheff.) B.Xue & R.M.K.Saunders
 Polyalthia luzonensis  B.Xue & R.M.K.Saunders
 Polyalthia malabarica  (Bedd.) I.M.Turner
 Polyalthia meghalayensis  V.Prakash & Mehrotra
 Polyalthia microsepala  Diels
 Polyalthia microtus  Miq.
 Polyalthia miliusoides  I.M.Turner
 Polyalthia mindorensis  Merr.
 Polyalthia miniata  Teijsm. & Binn.
 Polyalthia minima Jovet-Ast
 Polyalthia minutiflora  Elmer
 Polyalthia monocarpioides  I.M.Turner
 Polyalthia montis-silam  D.M.Johnson
 Polyalthia moonii  Thwaites
 Polyalthia motleyana  (Hook.f.) Airy Shaw
 Polyalthia myristica  I.M.Turner
 Polyalthia novoguineensis  (H.Okada) B.Xue & R.M.K.Saunders
 Polyalthia obliqua  Hook.f. & Thomson
 Polyalthia oblonga  King
 Polyalthia pakdin  I.M.Turner & Utteridge
 Polyalthia parviflora  Ridl.
 Polyalthia persicifolia  (Hook.f. & Thomson) Bedd.
 Polyalthia pisocarpa  (Hassk.) I.M.Turner
 Polyalthia polyphlebia  Diels
 Polyalthia praeflorens Bân
 Polyalthia pumila  Ridl.
 Polyalthia rufescens  Hook.f. & Thomson
 Polyalthia saprosma  I.M.Turner
 Polyalthia sessiliflora  (Ast) Bân
 Polyalthia socia  Craib
 Polyalthia spathulata  (Teijsm. & Binn.) Boerl.
 Polyalthia stellata  (Heusden) B.Xue & R.M.K.Saunders
 Polyalthia stenopetala  (Hook.f. & Thomson) Finet & Gagnep.
 Polyalthia stenophylla  I.M.Turner
 Polyalthia subcordata  (Blume) Blume - type species (range: Sumatera to Lesser Sunda Islands)
 Polyalthia suberosa  (Roxb.) Thwaites
 Polyalthia submontana  (Jessup) B.Xue & R.M.K.Saunders
 Polyalthia sympetala  I.M.Turner
 Polyalthia tipuliflora  D.M.Johnson
 Polyalthia trochilia  I.M.Turner
 Polyalthia venosa  Merr.
 Polyalthia verrucipes  C.Y.Wu ex P.T.Li
 Polyalthia watui  K.M.Wong
 Polyalthia xanthocarpa  B.Xue & R.M.K.Saunders
 Polyalthia yingjiangensis  Y.H.Tan & B.Xue

Reassigned to other genera
According to Plants of the World Online, species have been placed in the following genera:
 Disepalum
 Polyalthia pingpienensis P.T.Li is a synonym of Disepalum plagioneurum (Diels) D.M.Johnson
 Huberantha Chaowasku
 Polyalthia cerasoides (Roxb.) Bedd. is a synonym of Huberantha cerasoides (Roxb.) Chaowasku
 Polyalthia korinti (Dunal) Benth. & J. Hk. ex J. Hk. & Thoms is a synonym of Huberantha korinti (Dunal) Chaowasku
 Polyalthia nitidissima  is a synonym of Huberantha nitidissima (Dunal) Chaowasku
 Polyalthia palawanensis Merr. is a synonym of Huberantha palawanensis (Merr.) I.M.Turner
 Meiogyne
 Polyalthia laddiana A.C.Sm. is a synonym of Meiogyne laddiana (A.C.Sm.) B.Xue & R.M.K.Saunders  
 Monoon Miq.
 Polyalthia coffeoides (Hook.f. & Th.)  is a synonym of Monoon coffeoides (Thwaites ex Hook.f. & Thomson) B.Xue & R.M.K.Saunders
 Polyalthia fragrans (Dalz.) Bedd.
 Polyalthia glabra (Hook.f. & Th.) James Sincl.
 Polyalthia hookeriana King
 Polyalthia hypogaea King
 Polyalthia longifolia (Sonn.) Thwaites is a synonym of Monoon longifolium (Sonn.) B.Xue & R.M.K.Saunders
 Polyalthia pachyphylla King is a synonym of Monoon pachyphyllum (King) B.Xue & R.M.K.Saunders
 Polyalthia shendurunii Basha & Sasi. is now Monoon shendurunii (Basha & Sasidh.) B.Xue & R.M.K.Saunders
 Polyalthia simiarum (Buch.-Ham. ex Hook.f. & Thomson) Hook.f. & Thomson is a synonym of Monoon simiarum (Buch.-Ham. ex Hook.f. & Thomson) B.Xue & R.M.K.Saunders
  Phaeanthus
 Polyalthia macropoda King is a synonym of Phaeanthus ophthalmicus (Roxb. ex G.Don) J.Sinclair
  Polyalthiopsis Chaowasku
 Polyalthia floribunda Jovet-Ast is a synonym of Polyalthiopsis floribunda (Jovet-Ast) Chaowasku (Vietnam)
  Wuodendron B.Xue, Y.H.Tan & Chaowasku (monotypic)
 Polyalthia litseifolia C.Y.Wu ex P.T.Li is a synonym of Wuodendron praecox (Hook.f. & Thomson) B.Xue, Y.H.Tan & X.L.Hou

References

External links
 

 
Annonaceae genera
Taxonomy articles created by Polbot